Michael Andre Flores (born December 1, 1966) is a former American football defensive end in the National Football League for the Philadelphia Eagles, the San Francisco 49ers, and the Washington Redskins.  He played college football at the University of Louisville. He is remarried and resides outside of Washington, DC.

1966 births
Living people
American football defensive ends
Philadelphia Eagles players
San Francisco 49ers players
Washington Redskins players
Louisville Cardinals football players
Players of American football from Youngstown, Ohio